WQAQ (98.1 FM) is a student-run, non-commercial educational radio station  broadcasting in an open, music-oriented format. Licensed in Hamden, Connecticut, United States, the station serves the local Hamden/Wallingford area. WQAQ is owned by Quinnipiac University. and operated by WQAQ students.

Format
WQAQ has an open format. Any student, faculty, staff, or alumni of the Quinnipiac University may join the radio station and have his or her own radio show. The station's requirements are minimal, allowing DJs to play music and content of their choice. Shows last for one hour each, and the show schedule changes each semester. An up-to-date schedule is available on the station's website.

Antenna Controversy
On August 19, 2006, before the beginning of the Fall semester, WQAQ's broadcast antenna was deemed an "eyesore" by the administration of Quinnipiac University. Without notifying the students involved in the organization, the tower was removed from the top of the student center, where it has sat for X years. The tower's sudden removal put WQAQ's licensing with the FCC in jeopardy, and forced the station to shift its broadcast to online streaming.
During the summer of 2007, the WQAQ tower was rebuilt off-site, and the station resumed normal on-air broadcasting that school year.

Notable Former Staff
A number of former WQAQ staffers have gone on to careers in commercial radio and entertainment:

 Ryan Jones - Former MD - CBS Radio, WTIC-FM, Farmington, CT
" Little" John Principale - Former APD/MD, DJ - CBS Radio, WXRK-FM, New York, NY
 Rob Guerrera - Former DJ - Mike & Mike in the Morning on ESPN Radio, Bristol, CT
 DJ Concept (AKA Kid Dee) - Former Music Director & DJ - Sirius Satellite Radio
 Joe LoGrippo - Host of Crosstown Rivals
 Dan Bahl - Former Host, From The Bleachers - Current Brand Manager and Drive Time Co-Host at 104.5 The Team in Albany, NY

References

External links
WQAQ Online

Hamden, Connecticut
Mass media in New Haven County, Connecticut
QAQ
Quinnipiac University
QAQ
Radio stations established in 1973
1973 establishments in Connecticut